Nemilichery railway station is one of the railway stations of the Chennai Central–Arakkonam section of the Chennai Suburban Railway Network. It serves the neighbourhood of Nemilichery, Thiruninravur a suburb of Chennai, and is located 27 km west of Chennai Central railway station. It has an elevation of 32.05 m above sea level.

Presently, Nemilichery, with three temporary shelters, is only a halt station and not a full-fledged one. However, all the 71 pairs of slow suburban trains halt at the station.

History
Nemilichery railway station is the newest railway station in the Chennai Central–Arakkonam section of the Chennai Suburban Railway Network. Southern Railway gave its in principle approval for the construction of a new railway station in 2002 and the site inspection was carried out by the then minister of state for railways, A. K. Moorthy, in 2003. The railway station was initially estimated at a cost of  5.8 million, with the Jaya Group of Educational Institutions contributing  2.5 million as public contribution towards the construction. The final cost of construction of the station, however, was about  10 million, including  3.574 million towards earth work for laying the platform and  3.828 million towards shifting of tracks.

The station was inaugurated on 5 February 2010. The lines at the station, however, were electrified on 29 November 1979, with the electrification of the Chennai Central–Tiruvallur section.

The subway connecting the two sides of the neighbourhoods was completed by March 2016 and was commissioned to public use on 21 April 2016

Neighbourhoods
The station serves the neighbourhood, including East Thiruninravur, Srinath Nagar, TI Nagar, Gomathi Amman Nagar, Ambal Nagar, Nehru Nagar, Nemilichery, Annambedu, West Thandurai, Abirami Nagar, and Rajankuppam.

See also
 Chennai Suburban Railway
 Railway stations in Chennai

References

External links
 Nemilichery station at Indiarailinfo.com

 

Stations of Chennai Suburban Railway
Railway stations in Chennai
Railway stations in Tiruvallur district